Thomas Balch may refer to:
 Thomas Balch (historian), American historian
 Thomas Balch (minister), colonial American minister
 Thomas Bloomer Balch, Presbyterian pastor